Oliver Winston Wanger (born November 27, 1940) is a former United States district judge of the United States District Court for the Eastern District of California.

Education and early career

Born in Los Angeles, California, Wanger received a Bachelor of Science degree from the University of Southern California in 1963. From 1960 to 1967 he was a United States Marine Corps Reserve Sergeant. Wanger completed a Bachelor of Laws from the University of California, Berkeley, Boalt Hall School of Law in 1966. He served as a deputy district attorney of Fresno County from 1967 to 1969, and an adjunct professor at Humphreys College Laurence Drivon School of Law from 1968 to 1969.

San Joaquin College of Law

In 1969, Wanger joined Fresno County Municipal Court Judge Dan Eymann and attorney John Loomis to found San Joaquin College of Law (SJCL) in Fresno, California. Wanger served as an adjunct professor at SJCL from 1970 to 1991 and served as Dean from 1980 to 1983.

Legal career

Wanger was City Attorney for Mendota, California from 1975 to 1980. He was a Judge Pro Tem, Superior Court of California, County of Fresno in 1988. He was a Pro tem settlement conference judge, Superior Court of California, County of Fresno in 1989.

He was a United States District Judge of the United States District Court for the Eastern District of California. Wanger was nominated by President George H. W. Bush on January 8, 1991, to a seat vacated by Judge Milton Lewis Schwartz. He was confirmed by the United States Senate on March 21, 1991, and received his commission on March 25, 1991. He assumed senior status on May 31, 2006.

Sitting in Fresno, Judge Wanger became known as the chief arbiter of California's water wars. The highly technical scientific disputes Wanger was forced to resolve would require him to rely on his own appointed expert witnesses and often to issue rulings that were hundreds of pages long. During the bitterly contested delta smelt case, Judge Wanger drew national attention when he lengthily ridiculed a testifying government scientist for being a "zealot". In September 2011 he announced that he would retire on September 30, 2011. When stepping off the bench Judge Wanger observed that his time of service had left him with few friends.

References

External links
FJC Bio

1940 births
Living people
California state court judges
Judges of the United States District Court for the Eastern District of California
Humphreys College Laurence Drivon School of Law faculty
San Joaquin College of Law faculty
United States Marine Corps reservists
United States district court judges appointed by George H. W. Bush
20th-century American judges
University of Southern California alumni
UC Berkeley School of Law alumni